Craig Richards may refer to:

 Craig Richards (DJ) (born 1966), English tech house DJ
 Craig Richards (rugby) (born 1978), Welsh rugby league player
 Craig Richards (footballer) (born 1959), Welsh former footballer 
 Craig Richards (boxer) (born 1990), British professional boxer
 Craig W. Richards (born 1975), American lawyer and Attorney General of Alaska
 Reverend Craig Richards, fictional character on the Australian soap opera Neighbours